The 1st Guards Infantry Brigade was a military unit of the Imperial Guard, and later the Imperial Guards Division. In 1939 it was succeeded by the Guards Mixed Brigade.

Military Action

Russo-Japanese war

The 1st Guards Brigade was a part of the 1st Guards Division during the Russo-Japanese war. The brigade was commanded by Asada Nobuoki.

References

 Madej, W. Victor, Japanese Armed Forces Order of Battle, 1937-1945 [2 vols] Allentown, PA: 1981

Japanese World War II brigades
Military units and formations of the Imperial Japanese Army
Military units and formations established in 1867
Military units and formations disestablished in 1939